Wetmorena agasepsoides, the serpentine four-toed galliwasp, is an endangered species of lizard of the Diploglossidae family endemic to the Dominican Republic on the Caribbean island of Hispaniola.

Taxonomy
It was formerly classified in the genus Celestus, but was moved to Wetmorena in 2021.

References

Wetmorena
Reptiles described in 1971
Reptiles of the Dominican Republic
Endemic fauna of the Dominican Republic
Taxa named by Richard Thomas (herpetologist)